Torin may refer to:

 Torin (given name), a list of people and fictional characters
 Joseph Torin (1849–1907), French actor, known for his comic roles
 Symphony Sid Torin (1909–1984), jazz disc jockey born Sidney Tarnopol
 A version of the military side cap
 Torin, a frazione (subdivision) of the comune of Pontey, Italy
 Torin, New Britain, a small populated place in Papua, New Guinea

See also
 Tōrin-in, a sub-temple in Kyoto, Japan
 Tōrin-in (Naruto), a temple in Naruto, Japan
 Torrin (disambiguation)